Adenylyltransferase and sulfurtransferase MOCS3 is an enzyme that in humans is encoded by the MOCS3 gene.

Molybdenum cofactor (MoCo) is necessary for the function of all molybdoenzymes. One of the enzymes required for the biosynthesis of MoCo is molybdopterin synthase (MPT synthase, encoded by MOCS2/Mocs2 in mammals). The protein encoded by this gene adenylates and activates MPT synthase. This gene contains no introns. A pseudogene of this gene is present on chromosome 14.

References

Further reading